Hyperparachma is a genus of snout moths. It was described by William Warren in 1891.

Species
 Hyperparachma bursarialis (Walker, 1866)
 Hyperparachma congrualis (Amsel, 1956)

References

Chrysauginae
Pyralidae genera